Pseudoudoteaceae is a family of green algae in the order Bryopsidales. It contains four species across two genera.

References

Ulvophyceae families
Bryopsidales